Mark Christopher (born July 8, 1963, in Fort Dodge, Iowa) is a screenwriter and director most known for directing 54 (1998), starring Ryan Phillippe, Mike Meyers, Salma Hayek, and Neve Campbell.

Within the film community, he is better known for the success of the director's cut of the film that premiered at the 2015 Berlin International Film Festival. With over 30 minutes of re-shoots cut out of the 1998 version, and over 40 minutes re-instated, the film was universally lauded by critics and hailed as a "jubilant resurrection" and "a lost gay classic." The story of the films destruction and resurrection was featured on New York magazine's Vulture.com website. and The Guardian and Elvis Mitchell's interview with Mark Christopher on KCRW's The Treatment.

Christopher also directed three short films, all of them theatrically distributed: The Dead Boys Club (1992), an influential short of the New Queer Cinema wave as cited by B. Ruby Rich in her Sight & Sound article that defined the genre; Alkali, Iowa (1995), winner of the Teddy at the Berlin International Film Festival (1996); and Heartland, Strand Releasing (2007).  He is also known for his television writing and creation of musical programming, including Real Life: The Musical that premiered on OWN in 2012.

Filmography
 Mid-Century Moderns live stage juke box musical (2022, Desert Rose Playhouse, Palm Springs) (Writer/Director)
 Berlin TV series (2022, Stampede Ventures and Leonine Studios, American/German co-production)(Writer/Creator)
 Mark Christopher Shorts Retrospective collection of short films (2021, Here TV) (Writer/Director)
 Sara feature (2018, Bionaut) (Writer)
 Berlin pilot (2016, Warner Bros) (Writer)
 Cleopatra VII series (2015) (Writer/Creator)
 8.3 short (2014) (Executive Producer)
 Real Life: The Musical series (2013, OWN/ITV)(Creator, Executive Producer)
 Heartland pilot (2007, Strand Releasing) (Writer/Director)
 Pizza feature (2005, IFC) (Writer/Director)
 54 feature  (1998, Miramax) (Writer/Director)
 Boys Life 6 featured short Heartland (2007, Strand Releasing/2021 Frameline)
 Boys Life 2 featured short film Alkali Iowa (1997, Strand Releasing/2021 Frameline)  (writer, director)
 Boys' Shorts: The New Queer Cinema featured short film The Dead Boys' Club (1993, Frameline/2021 Frameline) (Writer/Director)
 The Dead Boys' Club (1992, Frameline) (Writer/Director)

References

External links
 

American film directors
1963 births
American male screenwriters
Living people
LGBT film directors